John Murnane (born 11 February 1948) is a former Australian rules footballer who played with Melbourne in the Victorian Football League (VFL). 

Following the end of his VFL career, Murnane played for Victorian Football Association (VFA) club Oakleigh, playing in their 1972 First Division premiership team and kicked 51 goals in the 1974 season.

Notes

Sources
 Fiddian, M. (2016) The VFA, Melbourne Sports Books: Melbourne.

External links 		

		
		
		
		
1948 births
Living people
Australian rules footballers from Victoria (Australia)		
Melbourne Football Club players
Oakleigh Football Club players